Hypalocrinus is a monotypic genus of echinoderms belonging to the family Isocrinidae. The only species is Hypalocrinus naresianus.

The species is found in Malesia.

References

Isocrinidae
Crinoid genera
Monotypic echinoderm genera